Salah Hasarma is a retired Arab-Israeli footballer who works now as a manager.

Honours

League
Israeli Premier League (1):
2011–12
Israeli Second Division (3):
1995-96, 2006-07, 2009-10

Cup
Toto Cup (2):
2010–11, 2011–12
Toto Cup (Leumit) (2):
2006–07, 2009–10

References

1974 births
Living people
Arab citizens of Israel
Israeli footballers
People from Bi'ina
Footballers from Northern District (Israel)
Hapoel Tayibe F.C. players
Bnei Sakhnin F.C. players
Bnei Yehuda Tel Aviv F.C. players
Hapoel Haifa F.C. players
Hapoel Ironi Kiryat Shmona F.C. players
Liga Leumit players
Israeli Premier League players
Hapoel Ironi Kiryat Shmona F.C. managers
F.C. Kafr Qasim managers
Israeli Premier League managers
Association football defenders
Israeli football managers